WXDC (92.9 FM) is a country music formatted broadcast radio station licensed to Berkeley Springs, West Virginia, serving Berkeley Springs in West Virginia and Hancock in Maryland.  WXDC is owned John and David Raese's West Virginia Radio Corporation, through licensee West Virginia Radio Corporation of the Alleghenies.

West Virginia Media Corporation began operating WXDC and sister-station WCST on May 1, 2019, as they begin the process of buying the two stations from Metro Radio, Inc.

History
The station came on the air as WCST-FM in 1965, but later changed to WDHC with the "Down Home County" branding in 1996.  WDHC was originally on 93.5 FM and moved to 92.9 FM in 2005 with a taller tower and twice the original size and double the original power of 93.5.  WXDC's distant grade signal can be heard in Winchester, Virginia, Hagerstown, Maryland and Martinsburg, West Virginia.

In April 2009, WDHC DJ Travis Lee, 27, known on the air as "Mr. T", was killed by a train while camping with friends in Morgan County, West Virginia.

In 2011, WDHC switched their branding from "Down Home Country" to "Country 92-9" and to a more mainstream Country format, as well as updating their website.  In March 2014, WDHC dropped its longtime Country format for a hybrid Classic Hits/Classic Top 40 format as "Max 92-9".

In January 2017, WDHC was sold to Metro Radio of Fairfax, Virginia, who owns WTNT in the Washington market. The purchase was consummated on March 1, 2017, at a price of $365,000. Metro fired the entire staff, changed the callsign to WXDC, and began simulcasting WTNT's Spanish-language programming on March 8. Due to community backlash, Metro Radio entered into a local marketing agreement with Hancock, Maryland restaurant owner Diane Smith, who flipped the station back to English-language classic hits "Max 92-9" on May 1. On January 1, 2018, WXDC changed to oldies from classic hits.

On May 1, 2019, West Virginia Radio Corporation began operating WXDC and sister station WCST as it began the process of buying the stations from Metro Radio.  The local marketing agreement with Diane Smith ended on April 30, 2019.  At 9:00am, on May 1, 2019 WXDC relaunched their Oldies format as "Cool 92.9".  On October 11, 2019, WXDC shifted back from Oldies to Classic Hits.  On March 1, 2020, WXDC changed formats from Classic Hits back to their longtime Country music format. The purchase, at a price of $365,000, was consummated on March 3, 2021.

References

External links
92.9 WXDC Online
92.9 WXDC on Facebook

Bath (Berkeley Springs), West Virginia
1965 establishments in West Virginia
Country radio stations in the United States
Radio stations established in 1965
XDC